This is a list of every song ever released by American industrial rock band Nine Inch Nails. It gives information about songwriter(s), length, original release, and year of release. It contains all the songs of the previously released albums, singles and EPs, and all B-sides.

Songs

Notes

References

External links 
 Nine Inch Nails Homepage
 Further information about the Nine Inch Nails discography in the NIN wiki

 
Nine Inch Nails